Ashuelot is an unincorporated community in the town of Winchester near the southwestern corner of New Hampshire, United States. The village is named after the Ashuelot River.

New Hampshire Route 119 passes through the village, connecting Hinsdale to the west and the village of Winchester to the east. A covered bridge crosses the Ashuelot River at the village. Ashuelot has a separate ZIP code (03441) from the rest of the town of Winchester.

References

Unincorporated communities in New Hampshire
Unincorporated communities in Cheshire County, New Hampshire
Winchester, New Hampshire
New Hampshire placenames of Native American origin